Rafael Carlos Merry del Val  (Seville, 4 November 1831 - San Sebastian, 29 August 1917) was a Spanish nobleman and diplomat.

He had missions at the courts of the Kings of Belgium and Great Britain. He married Dona Sofía Josefa de Zulueta y Wilcox and from this marriage some famous children were born.

Children 
 1864: Alfonso Merry del Val, Marquess of Merry del Val; ambassador
 1865: Rafael Merry del Val y de Zulueta; cardinal 
 1867: Pedro Merry del Val y Zulueta
 -?-: Domingo Merry del Val y Zulueta.

Honours 
 1878: Grand Cordon in the Order of Leopold.

References

Spanish diplomats
19th-century Spanish nobility
1831 births
1917 deaths